Jericho Xavier Setubal Cruz (born October 11, 1990) is a Filipino-Guamanian professional basketball player for the San Miguel Beermen of the Philippine Basketball Association (PBA).

High school and college career
Cruz started his basketball career in Saipan where he helped the CNMI national basketball team in a sixth-place finish. In 2008, he also helped CNMI FIBA Oceania Youth Tournament to a sixth-place finish and in the process, was voted as one of the tournament's Top 5 players.

He then decided to try his luck in the Philippines where he initially played for Rizal Technological University in 2010, the same year when the Blue Thunder ruled the State Colleges and Universities Athletic Association.

He was also a member of RTU’s two-time runner up squad in the National Capital Region Athletic Association where the Blue Thunder lost to Olivarez College and Colegio de Sta. Monica in 2010 and 2011. He was a member of the Mythical Team in 2011.

He was spotted by then Adamson Soaring Falcons coach Leo Austria while playing in a tournament in Bacolod. He averaged 10.1 points per game in his first tour of duty with the Falcons in the 2011 FilOil Flying V Preseason tournament then averaged 12.3 markers per outing in his rookie year with Adamson in the 2012 UAAP season.

He elected to forgo his final year with the Falcons and applied for the 2014 PBA draft.

Professional career
Cruz was drafted 9th overall by Rain or Shine in the 2014 PBA draft.

On December 5, 2014, he registered his first breakout game against Alaska, finishing 16 points on 6-for-7 shooting. Two days later, he suffered a broken foot during their game against Ginebra and was out for the rest of the All-Filipino conference. He has since returned to active play in the 2015 Commissioner's Cup.

He was recognized during the 2016 PBA Leo Awards as he bagged the Most Improved Player trophy.

On February 15, 2018, he was traded to TNT KaTropa in exchange for rookie Sidney Onwubere, Kris Rosales, and 2018 first round pick.

On June 10, 2019, Cruz was traded to the NLEX Road Warriors in a three-team trade involving NLEX, TNT, and NorthPort Batang Pier. On December 31, 2021, he became an unrestricted free agent, but he eventually re-signed a two-month deal with NLEX on January 20, 2022.

On March 1, 2022, he became an unrestricted free agent again after not re-signing with NLEX. He immediately signed a three-year contract with the San Miguel Beermen on the same day. Four months thereafter Cruz set his career-high 30 points in SMB's tough win over TNT.

PBA career statistics

As of the end of 2020 season

Season-by-season averages

|-
| align=left | 
| align=left | Rain or Shine
| 40 || 17.0 || .421 || .237 || .861 || 2.4 || 1.4 || .7 || .0 || 6.6
|-
| align=left | 
| align=left | Rain or Shine
| 53 || 24.4 || .483 || .367 || .748 || 3.2 || 2.1 || .8 || .1 || 12.5
|-
| align=left | 
| align=left | Rain or Shine
| 38 || 23.8 || .396 || .306 || .735 || 4.5 || 2.4 || 1.0 || .1 || 9.8
|-
| align=left rowspan=2| 
| align=left | Rain or Shine
| rowspan=2|27 || rowspan=2|20.7 || rowspan=2|.415 || rowspan=2|.355 || rowspan=2|.710 || rowspan=2|2.9 || rowspan=2|2.8 || rowspan=2|1.3 || rowspan=2|.1 || rowspan=2|8.0
|-
| align=left | TNT
|-
| align=left rowspan=2| 
| align=left | TNT
| rowspan=2|25 || rowspan=2|23.3 || rowspan=2|.372 || rowspan=2|.270 || rowspan=2|.719 || rowspan=2|3.8 || rowspan=2|3.4 || rowspan=2|.9 || rowspan=2|– || rowspan=2|9.4
|-
| align=left | NLEX
|-
| align=left | 
| align=left | NLEX
| 10 || 25.9 || .516 || .383 || .696 || 2.5 || 3.8 || 1.3 || .2 || 13.2
|-
| align=left rowspan=2| 
| align=left | NLEX
| rowspan=2|26 || rowspan=2|24.6 || rowspan=2|.432 || rowspan=2|.256 || rowspan=2|.698 || rowspan=2|3.3 || rowspan=2|3.0 || rowspan=2|1.3 || rowspan=2|.1 || rowspan=2|9.5
|-
| align=left | San Miguel
|-
|-class=sortbottom
| align=center colspan=2 | Career
| 219 || 22.4 || .433 || .314 || .752 || 3.3 || 2.4 || 1.0 || .1 || 9.7

National team career
Cruz was a part of the Philippines team that won the gold medal at the 2013 Southeast Asian Games basketball tournament in Naypyidaw, Myanmar.

He has also represented the Northern Mariana Islands at the youth level, playing in the 2008 FIBA Oceania Youth Tournament leading CNMI to a sixth-place finish and in the process, was voted as one of the tournament's Top 5 players, and in the 2010 Micronesian Games.

In January 2020, Cruz received a call-up to play for Guam at the 2022 FIBA Asia Cup qualifiers.

References

1990 births
Living people
Adamson Soaring Falcons basketball players
Basketball players from Metro Manila
Competitors at the 2013 Southeast Asian Games
Guamanian men's basketball players
Filipino men's basketball players
NLEX Road Warriors players
Northern Mariana Islands sportsmen
People from Pasig
Philippine Basketball Association All-Stars
Philippines men's national basketball team players
Rain or Shine Elasto Painters draft picks
Rain or Shine Elasto Painters players
Rizal Technological University alumni
San Miguel Beermen players
Shooting guards
Southeast Asian Games gold medalists for the Philippines
Southeast Asian Games medalists in basketball
TNT Tropang Giga players